Only People (Samo ljudi) is a 1957 Yugoslav film directed by Branko Bauer, starring  and Milorad Margetić.

In 1999, a poll of Croatian film critics found it to be one of the best films ever made in Croatia.

References

External links
 

1957 films
1950s Croatian-language films
Films directed by Branko Bauer
Jadran Film films
Croatian drama films
Croatian black-and-white films
1957 drama films
Yugoslav drama films